Elmar Borrmann (born 18 January 1957) is a German fencer. He won a gold and silver medal in the team épée event for West Germany in 1984 and 1988 and a gold in the same event for Germany in 1992.

Biography
Elmar Borrmann attended the Kaufmännische Schule Tauberbischofsheim and fought for the Fencing-Club Tauberbischofsheim.

References

External links 

 

1957 births
Living people
German male fencers
Olympic fencers of West Germany
Olympic fencers of Germany
Fencers at the 1984 Summer Olympics
Fencers at the 1988 Summer Olympics
Fencers at the 1992 Summer Olympics
Fencers at the 1996 Summer Olympics
Olympic gold medalists for West Germany
Olympic silver medalists for West Germany
Olympic gold medalists for Germany
Sportspeople from Stuttgart
Olympic medalists in fencing
Medalists at the 1984 Summer Olympics
Medalists at the 1988 Summer Olympics
Medalists at the 1992 Summer Olympics
20th-century German people
21st-century German people